Jean-François Eugène Robinet (24 April 1825, in Vic-sur-Seille – 3 November 1899, in Paris), was a French psychiatrist and historian who advocated the positivism of Auguste Comte.  He was curator at the Carnavalet Museum and mayor of the 6th arrondissement of Paris.

Selected Works
 Notice sur l’œuvre et la vie d’Auguste Comte, (1860) Paris: Dunod
 La Révolution française : Danton. Mémoire sur sa vie privée (1865) Paris: Chamerot et Lauwereyns
 Le procès des Dantonistes (1879) Paris: E. Leroux
 Danton Homme d’État (1889) Paris: Charavay Frères

References

French psychiatrists
19th-century French historians
French curators
6th arrondissement of Paris
1825 births
1899 deaths